The Miss Tennessee competition is the pageant that selects the representative for the state of Tennessee in the Miss America Scholarship Competition.

Lauren Dickson of Parsons was crowned Miss Tennessee 2022 on June 25, 2022 at the Cannon Center for the Performing Arts in Memphis, Tennessee. She competed for the title of Miss America 2023 at the Mohegan Sun in Uncasville, Connecticut in December 2022.

History
The Miss Tennessee pageant was first held in 1938, although the winner, Isobel Carter, was unable to compete at Miss America due to illness and so the 1st runner-up became Miss Tennessee. The following year, two winners were chosen to compete for the Miss America title. In 1940 the pageant suffered a repeat of 1938, with the winner resigning through illness and the 1st runner-up representing the state at the national competition. The routine pageant was held in 1941, but from 1942 to 1946 representatives were appointed without a pageant being held, due to World War II. In 1947 twins Jean and Jane Cunningham were both awarded the Miss Tennessee title, with one representing Tennessee and one Chattanooga at the Miss America pageant. The modern era of the pageant can be dated to 1953, when a regular routine of state pageants was instituted.

Barbara Jo Walker was crowned Miss America 1947 and represented the city of Memphis when she won the title. Kellye Cash, Miss America 1987, was the second Miss Tennessee to win the national title.  All three Miss Tennessees from 1999 to 2001 later won the similar Miss Tennessee USA pageant, whose delegates represent Tennessee at the Miss USA pageant. Three other Miss Tennessees have won the Miss Tennessee USA title, Jean Harper, Desiree Daniels, and Leah Hulan. Two Miss Tennessees have won the National Sweetheart title, Rita Wilson and Vicki Hurd.

In the fall of 2018, the Miss America Organization terminated the former Miss Tennessee organization's license as well as licenses from Florida, Georgia, New Jersey, New York, Pennsylvania, and West Virginia.  On December 22, 2018, Miss America Awarded a new license for Tennessee naming Joe Albright as CEO; Lanna Keck-Smith, Miss Tennessee 1997, as Executive Director; and Caty Davis, Miss Tennessee 2017, as the Chief People Officer.

Gallery of past titleholders

Results summary
The following is a visual summary of the past results of Miss Tennessee titleholders at the national Miss America pageants/competitions. The year in parentheses indicates the year of the national competition during which a placement and/or award was garnered, not the year attached to the contestant's state title.

Placements 
 Miss Americas: Barbara Jo Walker (1947), Kellye Cash (1987)
 1st runners-up: Desiree Daniels (1983)
 2nd runners-up: Vicki Hurd (1967), Dana Brown (1991), Stephanie Culberson (2002), Stefanie Wittler (2010)
 3rd runners-up: Martha Truett (1964)
 Top 7: Ellen Carrington (2009), Hannah Robison (2016)
 Top 10: Gerry Johnson (1955), Marion "Mickey" Wayland (1960), Brenda Seal (1969), Deborah Kincaid (1975), Linda Moore (1978), Shelly Mangrum (1985), Erin Hatley (2012), Chandler Lawson (2013), Hayley Lewis (2015), Grace Burgess (2017)
 Top 12: Caty Davis (2018)
 Top 13: Lee Henson (1945)
 Top 15: Georgia Cunningham (1947), Lois Jeanette Welch (1948), Jean Harper (1952)
 Top 16: Grace Gore (2008)

Awards

Preliminary awards
 Preliminary Evening Gown: Stephanie Culberson (2002)
 Preliminary Lifestyle and Fitness: Lee Henson (1945), Linda Moore (1978), Desiree Daniels (1983), Kellye Cash (1987), Stephanie Culberson (2002)
 Preliminary Talent: Barbara Jo Walker (1947), Dorothy Free (1948), Deborah Kincaid (1975), Kellye Cash (1987), Grace Burgess (2017)

Non-finalist awards
 Non-finalist Interview: Alison Shumate (1996)
 Non-finalist Talent: Mary Cox (1970), Elise Neal (1980), Moira Kaye (1984), Carrie Folks (1989), Beth Hood (2001), Ashley Eicher (2005), Tara Burns (2006)

Other awards
 Miss Congeniality: N/A
 America's Choice: Hannah Robison (2016)
 Intercity Beauty Award Second Prize: Sue Burton (1922)
 Evening Dress Award: Elizabeth Mallory (1923)
 Equity & Justice Scholarship Award Finalists: Brianna Mason (2020)
Forever Miss America Scholarship: Tally Bevis (2022)
 Quality of Life Award 1st runners-up: Hannah Robison (2016)
 Quality of Life Award 2nd runners-up: Chandler Lawson (2013)
 Quality of Life Award Finalists: Heather Heath (1999), Grace Gore (2008) Stefanie Wittler (2010), Grace Burgess (2017), Christine Williamson (2019)
 Roller Chair Parade Second Prize: Elizabeth Mallory (1923)
 STEM Scholarship Award Winners: Hannah Robison (2016)
Top Fundraiser 3rd runner-up: Tally Bevis (2022)
 Waterford Scholarship for Business in Marketing and Management: Allison Alderson (2000)
Women in Business 2nd runner-up: Tally Bevis (2022)
 Women in Business Scholarship Award Finalists: Christine Williamson (2019)

Winners

Notes

References

External links
 Miss Tennessee official website

Tennessee
Tennessee culture
Women in Tennessee
Recurring events established in 1938
1938 establishments in Tennessee
Annual events in Tennessee